Beketovo is a rural locality (a village) in Yaganovskoye Rural Settlement, Cherepovetsky District, Vologda Oblast, Russia. The population was 23 as of 2002.

Geography 
Sobolevo is the nearest rural locality.

References 

Rural localities in Cherepovetsky District